Bobrowa may refer to the following places:
Bobrowa, Łódź Voivodeship (central Poland)
Bobrowa, Podlaskie Voivodeship (north-east Poland)
Bobrowa, Subcarpathian Voivodeship (south-east Poland)
Bobrowa, Opole Voivodeship (south-west Poland)